Charles Beauclerk, 2nd Duke of St Albans, KG KB (6 April 1696 – 27 July 1751) was a British politician who sat in the House of Commons from 1718 until 1726 when he succeeded to a peerage as Duke of St Albans. He was an illegitimate grandson of King Charles II.

Origins
He was the son and heir of Charles Beauclerk, 1st Duke of St Albans by his wife Diana de Vere, daughter and sole heiress of Aubrey de Vere, 20th Earl of Oxford. His paternal grandparents were King Charles II of England and his mistress Nell Gwynne. He was styled Earl of Burford until 1726.

Career
He was educated at Eton College from 1706 and matriculated at New College, Oxford on 24 April 1714. From 1716 to 1717 he undertook a Grand Tour in Italy.

He was elected as a Member of Parliament for Bodmin, Cornwall, at a by-election on 26 February 1718. At the 1722 general election he was returned as an MP for Windsor. He sat until 1726 when on the death of his father he succeeded to the peerage and vacated his seat in the House of Commons. He was appointed Master of the Hawks in 1726 which office he held until his death. He was Lord Lieutenant of Berkshire from 1727 to his death. In 1730 he was appointed Constable and Governor of Windsor Castle and Warden of Windsor Forest. He was appointed Lord of the Bedchamber in 1738 and held the position until his death. He was High Steward of Windsor.

Marriage and children
On 13 December 1722 he married Lucy Werden   the eldest daughter and co-heiress of Sir John Werden, 2nd Baronet, with whom he had two children:
 George Beauclerk, 3rd Duke of St Albans (1730–1786); son and heir
 Lady Diana Beauclerk (c. 1746–1766); married the Rev. and Hon. Shute Barrington, a son of John Shute Barrington, 1st Viscount Barrington.

Mistresses
With his mistress and first-cousin Renee Lennox (1709–1774), illegitimate daughter of Charles Lennox, 1st Duke of Richmond (himself an illegitimate son of Charles II of England), he had a daughter:
 Diane Beauclerk-Lennox (1727–?); became the mistress of Baron Alessandro Mompalao Cuzkeri.

With his mistress Marie-Françoise de la Rochefoucauld, daughter of Casimir-Jean Charles, Lord of Fontpastour and Chey, he had a daughter:
 Suzanne Beauclerk; married Jean IX Nolasque, Marquess of Noves and Count of Mimet.

Death and burial
Beauclerk died in 1751, aged 55 in London, and was interred in Westminster Abbey.

References

1696 births
1751 deaths
People educated at Eton College
Alumni of New College, Oxford
Charles
Burford, Charles Beauclerk, Earl of
102
Knights of the Garter
Knights Companion of the Order of the Bath
Lord-Lieutenants of Berkshire
Charles
Burford, Charles Beauclerk, Earl of
Burford, Charles Beauclerk, Earl of
Burford, Charles Beauclerk, Earl of
Burials at Westminster Abbey